Miechów  is a town in Poland, in Lesser Poland Voivodeship, about  north of Kraków. It is the capital of Miechów County. Population is 11,852 (2004). Miechów lies on the Miechówka river, along European route E77.

History
In the early years of the Polish state, the area of Miechów belonged to the medieval tribe of the Vistulans. In the late 10th century, the region was taken over by the Polans. The beginning of Miechów dates back to the year 1163, when a Polish Duke of Pomerania Jaksa of the House of Griffins, who owned the village, invited monks of the Order of the Holy Sepulchre. Apart from Miechów, prince Jaksa handed two other villages to the order.

The new church with a monastery was blessed by the Bishop of Kraków Gędka in 1170. Miechów took advantage of the presence of the order. The settlement expanded together with the abbey, and in 1290 prince Przemysł II granted it the town charter based on Magdeburg rights. Despite convenient location along merchant routes, Miechów grew very slowly, due to numerous wars and conflicts. In the early 14th century, the town was burned down by Prince of Masovia Bolesław, who supported Władysław Łokietek. This incident took place during the Rebellion of wójt Albert, in which the town and the abbey supported the rebels. As a result, the monks were forced to leave Poland for a few years. After their return, King Łokietek banned Germans from the post of the abbot of the monastery. In the second half of the 15th century Miechów burned several times, and in the early 16th century, it had 70 houses. In 1525 the abbey was expanded, when Chapel of Tomb of Christ was built. Pilgrims from all over Poland began to come here. Miechów had a wooden town hall in the market square.

Partitions of Poland

In 1790, the population of Miechów was 1,300. After the Partitions of Poland, the town briefly belonged to the Habsburg Empire. Since 1815, it was part of Russian-controlled Congress Poland. It was the seat of a county in Kraków Voivodeship, and on January 16, 1816, Miechów became the capital of the voivodeship, as the city of Kraków itself did not belong to the Russian Empire. A few months later, on August 6, 1816, the capital of the province was moved to Kielce. In 1830, a modern road was completed from Warsaw to Kraków; furthermore, small enterprises were opened in Miechów. During the January Uprising (Feb. 17, 1863), Polish rebels tried to seize the town, but failed. In retribution, Russian soldiers set Miechów on fire, after which its population was reduced by 50%. In 1885 Miechów received a rail connection with Dąbrowa Górnicza and Kielce, due to a station at a nearby village of Charsznica.

On August 8, 1914, soldiers of the First Cadre Company entered Miechów, on their way to Kielce. The town remained in Austrian hands until November 1918. In 1934, the government of the Second Polish Republic completed the rail line from Kraków to Tunel, which provided direct connection between Kraków and Warsaw. As a result, Miechów finally received its own train station.

World War II
First Wehrmacht units entered Miechów on September 6, 1939. During World War II, the town belonged to Kraków District of the General Government. Miechów was an important center of the Home Army. From the beginning of its occupation, Germans terrorized the Jewish population, robbing them of their possessions, kidnapping them for labor gangs, and one night in April 1940, breaking into homes, attacking men and raping women, and then forcing the Jews to burn holy books in a bonfire and to sing and dance around it. In March 1941, Jews were forced into a ghetto which also included Jews from some surrounding villages. They could take only what they could carry into their new residences. In August 1942, 600 sick and elderly Jews were taken to Slomniki where they were held without food and water for several days and then some were shot on the spot and dumped into open pits. Some were sent to labor camps. Others were sent to Belzec where they were murdered immediately. In September 1942, German police units surrounded the ghetto and forced Jews to a field near the train station. Jews from other nearby towns were also taken there. From the thousands assembled, 800 or so men were sent to labor camps. The rest were sent to Belzec in trains coated with lime. These actions were typical of the fate of Jews in towns and villages throughout Poland during the Holocaust. Only a few Miechów Jews survived of the 2500 who lived there at the beginning of the war. 

Germans retreated on January 16, 1945 so quickly, that the town was not destroyed. After the war, Miechów was transferred from Kielce Voivodeship to Kraków Voivodeship. It was the seat of a large county, with such towns, as Proszowice, Słomniki and Książ Wielki.

Location
Local Nature reserves include: “Lipny Dół” in vicinity of Książ Wielki, “Biała Góra” in Tunel, and “Złota Góra” in Jaksice village. Near the Old Market Square there is a zero-category historic monument – the basilica and monastery of the Church of the Holy Sepulchre Order, founded in 1163. The monastery introduced the cult of the Holy Sepulchre in Poland. St. Vit Modest and Crescence Church in Nasiechowice and a wooden temple of Mother of Church in Przesławice are also notable.

The Jewish synagogue, located at 10 Adama Mickiewicza Street was built in the early 20th century. However, during the German occupation of Poland the synagogue was devastated by the Nazis and after World War II became municipal property, no longer serving its religious purpose. At present, the completely rebuilt synagogue houses a popular café.

Prominent individuals
An important local personality was Maciej of Miechów, Polish Renaissance scholar, doctor of medicine, canon, astrologist, historian, who was elected eight times as Rector of the Academy of Kraków. He's the author of the "Tractatus de duabus Sarmatiis" (Treatise on the Two Sarmatias), considered the first accurate geographical and ethnographical description of Eastern Europe. Among other people from Miechów there is Emanuel Tanay. The Polish diplomat and jurist Mieczysław Maneli was born in and grew up in Miechów.

References

External links

 Official town webpage
 Jewish Community in Miechów on Virtual Shtetl
 An English guide to Miechów
 

Cities and towns in Lesser Poland Voivodeship
Miechów County
Kraków Voivodeship (14th century – 1795)
Kielce Governorate
Kielce Voivodeship (1919–1939)
Holocaust locations in Poland